Events of 2015 in Somaliland.

Incumbents
President: Ahmed Mohamed Mohamoud
Vice President: Abdirahman Saylici
Speaker of the House: Abdirahman Mohamed Abdullahi
Chairman of the House: Suleiman Mohamoud Adan
 Chief Justice: 
Yusuf Ismail Ali (until April 19)
Adan Haji Ali (since April 19)
 Chief of Staff of Armed Forces: Ismail Shaqalle

Events

January
January 21

February
February 23
Somaliland closes the border with Djibouti

March
March 5

April
April 13
President Ahmed Mohamed Mohamoud announces that vote registrations will occur soon

May
May 28

June
June 11
Somaliland Immigration Army repatriated five people travelling from Somalia at Egal Airport, as a result of lack of legal travel documents.

July
July 4
Three people were killed and one was injured in a car accident in Galooley village on the road between Burao and Sheikh towns, The car was reportedly left in Hargeisa on its way to burao.

August
August 5
Nine people have died of thirst and famine in the Selel region, These people were residents and travelers who reportedly died at the Bank of Giriyat (banka giriyaad). Also, large numbers of livestock have died there.
Two people have been killed and ten others injured in a car accident at Qoyta town in the northwestern outskirts of Burao.

September
September 3

October
October 5

November
November 4

November 12
Five people were injured in clashes between police and a group of rioters in Erigavo, the clashes erupted after the police tried to apprehend a police officer who was alleged in connection with illegal weapon and a group defending him.

December
December 30
Wajaale district administration, the Somaliland Immigration Chief and the Police Chief for Wajaale have jointly addressed the arrest of 200 migrants and their smugglers, which was captured at the border town of Wajaale, making the largest number of migrants attempting to cross the border between Somaliland and Ethiopia.
A man committed suicide after hanged himself from a tree in Masallaha village on the southern outskirts of Hargeisa.

Deaths
March 21
Abdikeyd Abdillahi Yusuf – businessman
March 23
Hussein Mohamoud Awale – businessman
March 26
Elmi Roble Furre – sultan
June 13
Heis Barre Yusuf – sultan

References